Jean Ogier de Gombauld (1576 – 1666) was a French playwright and poet.

Gombauld was born in Saint-Just-Luzac, Charente-Maritime and was a Huguenot.  He was one of the original members of the Académie française.  He also wrote novels, but has been described as a mediocre novelist.  He died in Paris.

Works (selection) 
1624: L'Endimion 
1631: L'Amaranthe, pastorale
1646: Poésies
1658:  Épigrammes 
1647: Lettres
1658: Les Danaïdes, tragédie 
1667: Traitez et Lettres touchant la religion

References

External links
 

1576 births
1666 deaths
People from Charente-Maritime
Huguenots
17th-century French dramatists and playwrights
16th-century French novelists
17th-century French novelists
16th-century French poets
17th-century French poets
Members of the French Academy of Sciences
17th-century French male writers
French male poets